Transport Malta (or the Authority for Transport in Malta) is a government body overseeing transport in Malta. It comes under the authority of the Maltese Ministry of Transport and Infrastructure. It was created in 2010, taking over the previous functions of the Malta Maritime Authority, the Malta Transport Authority and the Director and Directorate of Civil Aviation. Transport Malta has charge of sea transport, including registration of ships; and regulation of civil aviation. In 2018, responsibility for building and maintenance of roads and public transport infrastructure was transferred from Transport Malta to the newly created Infrastructure Malta.

Organisation 
Transport Malta is composed of the following directorates:
 
Integrated Transport Strategy Directorate
Ports and Yachting Directorate
Merchant Shipping Directorate
Roads and Infrastructure Directorate (until 2018)
Land Transport Directorate
Civil Aviation Directorate
Corporate Services Directorate
Enforcement Directorate
Information and Communication Technology Directorate

References

External links 

 Official website
 Official ministry website

Road authorities
Transport organisations based in Malta
Government agencies of Malta
2010 establishments in Malta